Michael Patrick Pearson (born June 18, 1949) is an American author of hundreds of essays and eight books — a novel, Shohola Falls (2003), and seven works of non-fiction; Imagined Places: Journeys into Literary America (a New York Times Notable Book of 1992), A Place That's Known: Essays (1994), John McPhee (1997), Dreaming of Columbus: A Boyhood in the Bronx (1999), Innocents Abroad Too: Journeys Around the World on Semester at Sea (2008), Reading Life: On Books, Memory and Travel (2015), The Road to Dungannon: Journeys in Literary Ireland (2023).

For a decade, from 1997 to 2006, he directed the MFA Program in Creative Writing at Old Dominion University in Norfolk, Virginia.  He currently teaches non-fiction writing and American literature at ODU.

References

External links
 Michael Pearson's website

1949 births
21st-century American novelists
American male novelists
Living people
20th-century American novelists
20th-century American male writers
21st-century American male writers
20th-century American non-fiction writers
American male non-fiction writers